Manfred Björkquist (22 June 1884 – 23 November 1985) was a Swedish prelate who was the Bishop of Stockholm from 1942 till 1954, and co-founder of Sigtunaskolan Humanistiska Läroverket. He was also the leader of the Young Church conservative movement.

References 

Lutheran bishops of Stockholm
Swedish centenarians
Men centenarians
1884 births
1985 deaths